The Coca people are part of one of the oldest indigenous group who live in what is now the state of Nayarit, Mexico. The ancestral group were the Concheros, who first settled in coves on the Pacific coast of Nayarit, and made houses out of sea shells. Their Gods were the ocean and the wind. They became known in the passing years as the shaft tomb culture, because of cylindrical tombs spread throughout Nayarit and Jalisco, spreading down the west side of Lake Chapala all the way to Colima.

They later centered themselves in Ixtlan del Rio, Nayarit, and created beautiful and elaborate round temple to their wind god, and other municipal buildings. Their obsidian trade was a source of wealth, as it was abundant there. (Ixtlan means obsidian). Eventually they were invaded by the Nahua people who were moving south from the land of the Yaquis on what is now the north Mexican border. The aggressive Nahuatl invaders imposed a Lordship over the inhabitants of Ixtlan del Rio in approximately 1100 to 1200 CE (current era). The   Nahuatl Lords established an even wider obsidian trade, and tended to view the Coca people as servants (The Nahuatl word "coca" means servants.)

In 1310 a group of Coca tribe were led by "Big Eyes" to a safer place in a valley with steep mountains by the largest lake in central highlands. Chief Big Eyes had probably traveled past the west end of Lake Chapala before, or at least heard of it from the generations of Shaft Tomb culture in that area. From the west end of Lake Chapala, it looks like an inland sea, and always has a wind. This would have been a good omen for these people, who had said when the Nahuatl people had invaded that "The Wind God" had turned his face from them".  Lake Chapala had a good wind and so many fish that they believed it had its own  goddess, Michi Cihualli, sometimes used with the Nahuatl term "Teo' or Goddess, becoming "Teo Michi Cihualli" Woman or female goddess of the fish. Because there were steep mountains between them and the Nahua in Ixtlan del Rio they felt safe. It is possible that their chief was also privy to the Lordships plan to move toward the east above or North of those mountains, toward the area now known as Mexico city, and this branch of Cocas was safely positioned on the south side of that double mountain range running from west to east. The lake had many fish and good farm land. They called it Cuitzlan. They had no written language, so later in the about 1525 when the Spanish came across the lake from the southern shore and the Spanish thought the Coca were calling this only well developed village on the north shore Cosala. It became known thereafter as San Juan Cosala, since, of course, the Spanish missionaries converted them to Catholicism and gave them at saint's name. The Spanish also took some of their people 5 miles to the east to build a chapel in the even smaller fishing area now called Ajijic. Stories are told of how the Spanish also took some of the Coca tribe and much of the rock from the mountainside above them down to the west end of the lake, now known as Jocotepec, to build a chapel there also.

To this day the Coca people have a well-organized pueblo and a nearly circular 2 floor central gazebo with museum on first floor, that is very reminiscent of the architecture and city planning of Ixtlan del Rio.

References

Indigenous peoples in Mexico
Mesoamerican cultures